The Penny Dreadfuls are a British sketch comedy troupe consisting of comedians Humphrey Ker, David Reed and Thom Tuck, often supported by Margaret Cabourn-Smith. The troupe are best known for writing and performing The Brothers Faversham and The Penny Dreadfuls Present..., comic plays on BBC Radio 4.

History

Early history and Fringe shows (2006-2010) 

Ker, Reed and Tuck first met as students at the University of Edinburgh through the student comedy troupe The Improverts in 2001. They performed together for the next four years before forming, along with founding member Jamie Anderson, The Penny Dreadfuls. In 2006, they made their debut appearance at the Edinburgh Festival Fringe with their Victorian-themed sketch show Aeneas Faversham. The show's executive producer was Idil Sukan, while its associate producer and technical director were Steve Greer and Neil E Hobbs respectively. This group would go on to produce each Fringe show for the troupe for the next four years: Aeneas Faversham Returns in 2007, Aeneas Faversham Forever in 2008, The Never Man in 2009, and The Penny Dreadfuls in 2010.

TV & BBC Radio (2007–present) 
The troupe appeared on television in 2007 with a sketch in BBC Three's Comedy Shuffle. They then made the transfer onto radio in January 2008 with their own show, The Brothers Faversham, guest starring Miles Jupp and Ingrid Oliver. The four-part series was a fictional biography following  the life and demise of one of the Faversham brothers. A second series, More Brothers Faversham, was broadcast in October 2008 and later broadcast on BBC Radio 4.

Following on from this shift towards narrative comedy, in 2009 they wrote a comic retelling of the story of Guy Fawkes for the Afternoon Drama slot on Radio 4. While they returned to the sketch format for their 2010 Edinburgh Fringe show. their radio comedy followed in the vein of Guy Fawkes, writing a new historical comedy every year (except 2010 and 2013) for BBC Radio 4.

In 2011 Margaret Cabourn-Smith played a supporting role in Revolution, and became a regular fixture in most subsequent The Penny Dreadfuls Presents... plays. From 2012 onward, each play in The Penny Dreadfuls Presents... series was credited solely to Reed.

Radio episodes
All episodes star Ker, Reed, and Tuck.

The Brothers Faversham (2008)

More Brothers Faversham (2008)

The Penny Dreadfuls Present... (2009-present)

Awards

References

External links 
The Penny Dreadfuls on David Reed's website
The Penny Dreadfuls on Twitter

Edinburgh Festival performers
British comedy troupes
Comedy collectives
BBC Radio 4 programmes